Sternberg may refer to:

Places
Austria
Burgruine Sternberg, a castle ruin in Carinthia
Czech Republic
Šternberk, a town with an eponymous castle and seat of the mediæval County of Sternberg
Český Šternberk, a market town
Český Šternberk Castle, a castle
Germany
Sternberg, Mecklenburg-Vorpommern, a town
Sternberg, a castle in Extertal, North Rhine-Westphalia
Sternberg, a castle in Sulzdorf an der Lederhecke, Bavaria
County of Sternberg, a Middle Age county, nowadays part of Lippe
Poland
Torzym, a town

Others 
Sternberg (surname)
Von Sternberg, surname
Counts of Sternberg (Šternberkové), Bohemian nobility
Sternberg (crater) (or Shternberg), an eroded lunar impact crater on the Moon's far side
Sternberg Astronomical Institute, a research institution in Moscow, Russia
Sternberg Centre for Judaism, in London
Sternberg peer review controversy
Reed–Sternberg cell

See also
Starnberg, a city in Bavaria, Germany
Sternburg, a brand of German beer
Sternberger, a surname